Lucie Prioux (born 21 July 1997) is a French slalom canoeist who has competed at the international level since 2013.

She won a bronze medal in the C1 team event at the 2018 ICF Canoe Slalom World Championships in Rio de Janeiro. She also won a silver and three bronze medals at the European Championships.

World Cup individual podiums

References

External links

Living people
French female canoeists
1997 births
Medalists at the ICF Canoe Slalom World Championships